Araucaria scopulorum (rock araucaria) is a species of conifer in the family Araucariaceae. It is endemic to New Caledonia, where it is an endangered species. It occurs in small populations that are restricted to two main areas. It grows in shrubland on steep coastal slopes below 300m in altitude. Araucaria scopulorum is a relatively small tree compared to most other araucarias, with mature trees varying from 4–20 meters in height. Much of its habitat is located in areas with active nickel mining operations and no populations are in protected areas.

References

scopulorum
Endangered plants
Endemic flora of New Caledonia
Taxonomy articles created by Polbot
Taxa named by David John de Laubenfels